Arthur Marshall Neal (20 December 1903 – 1982) was an English footballer who played as an outside right in the Football League for Darlington. He was on the books of Rotherham County and Liverpool without playing League football for either, and also played non-league football for Gainsborough Trinity, Anston Athletic, Frickley Colliery, Denaby United, Kettering Town and Folkestone.

Neal was born in 1903 in Rotherham, which was then in the West Riding of Yorkshire, and died there in 1982 at the age of 78. His younger brother Dick played as a winger for clubs including Blackpool and Southampton, and Dick's son, also named Dick, played as a wing half for clubs including Birmingham City and Lincoln City in the 1950s and 1960s.

References

1903 births
1982 deaths
Footballers from Rotherham
English footballers
Association football outside forwards
Rotherham County F.C. players
Gainsborough Trinity F.C. players
Anston Athletic F.C. players
Frickley Athletic F.C. players
Liverpool F.C. players
Darlington F.C. players
Denaby United F.C. players
Kettering Town F.C. players
Folkestone F.C. players
Midland Football League players
English Football League players